The Roman Catholic Archdiocese of Juba is the Metropolitan See for the Ecclesiastical province of Juba in South Sudan.

History
 14 July 1927: Established as Apostolic Prefecture of Bahr el-Gebel from the Apostolic Prefecture of Nilo Equatoriale in Uganda 
 12 April 1951: Promoted as Apostolic Vicariate of Bahr el-Gebel 
 26 May 1961: Renamed as Apostolic Vicariate of Juba
 12 December 1974: Promoted as Metropolitan Archdiocese of Juba

Special churches
The seat of the archbishop is Saint Teresa’s Cathedral in Kator.

Bishops

Ordinaries
Prefects Apostolic of Bahr el-Gebel
 Giuseppe Zambonardi, M.C.C.I. (1 February 1928 – 1938)
 Stephen Mlakic, M.C.C.I. (21 October 1938 – 1950)
Vicar Apostolic of Bahr el-Gebel
 Sisto Mazzoldi, M.C.C.I. (8 July 1950 – 21 April 1951 see below)
 Vicar Apostolic of Juba 
 Sisto Mazzoldi, M.C.C.I. (see above 21 April 1951 – 12 June 1967), appointed Apostolic Administrator of Moroto, Uganda in 1965
 Metropolitan Archbishops of Juba 
 Ireneus Wien Dud (12 December 1974 – 1982)
 Paulino Lukudu Loro, M.C.C.I. (19 February 1983 – 12 December 2019)
 Stephen Ameyu Martin Mulla (12 December 2019 – present)

Auxiliary Bishops
Santo Loku Pio Doggale (2010–present)
Paride Taban (1980–1983), appointed Bishop of Torit

Suffragan Dioceses
 Malakal
 Rumbek
 Tombura–Yambio
 Torit
 Wau
 Yei

See also
Radio Bakhita
Roman Catholicism in South Sudan
List of Roman Catholic dioceses in South Sudan

Sources
 GCatholic.org
 Archdiocese of Juba

Juba